Basudeb Barman (born 5 October 1935) was a member of the 14th Lok Sabha of India. He represented the Mathurapur constituency of West Bengal and is a member of the Communist Party of India (Marxist) (CPI(M)) party.

Mr. Barman completed M.Sc. (Tech) in Applied Chemistry at the University of Calcutta. Mr. Barman was a professor at the University of Calcutta teaching Energy technology at the Department of Chemical Engineering. He has also been the Vice-Chancellor of Kalyani University.

He was nominated by the Left Front to contest the 2009 Lok Sabha election from Ranaghat (Lok Sabha constituency).

References

External links
 Official biographical sketch in Parliament of India website

Living people
1935 births
Communist Party of India (Marxist) politicians from West Bengal
People from Nadia district
Burman, Basudeb
India MPs 2004–2009
University of Calcutta alumni
Academic staff of the University of Calcutta
Lok Sabha members from West Bengal
People from South 24 Parganas district